Svan towers refers to the tower houses built as defensive dwellings in the Georgian historical region of Svaneti (present-day Samegrelo-Zemo Svaneti). These towers are unique to the region and were primarily built between the 9th and 12th centuries, during the Georgian Golden Age. However, the origins of the tower likely date back to prehistory.

Description
The Svan towers are either freestanding or attached to residential houses. The towers usually have 3-5 stories, and the thickness of the walls decreases with height, giving them a tapering appearance. The upper floors of the towers are exclusively used for defense, with machicolated parapets and embrasures providing cover when throwing projectiles. The connected houses are usually 80-130 square meters in ground area and have 2 floors: the ground floor of the house, called the machub, and the upper floor, called the darbazi. The ground floor is a single hall with a hearth and provides accommodation for both people and animals, with elaborately-decorated wooden partitions separating the two spaces. The second floor provides summer accommodation and storage. The second floor also provides access to the tower (if a tower is attached). The floors are connected by a wooden ladder.

Conservation
Many of the towers in the Svaneti region have fallen into disrepair or have disappeared entirely, however, Chazhashi in the Ushguli community has been preserved as a Museum-Reserve, containing over 200 of these towers. The unique architecture of the Svaneti towers and the medieval character of Ushguli, Mestia, and the Upper Svaneti led to the region's inscription on the UNESCO World Heritage List in 1996.

See also 

Chazhashi
Mestia
Ushguli
Vainakh tower architecture

References

External links
Haut Svaneti Unesco.
“Georgia As I Saw It” – Rare ethnographic sketches by 20th century Georgian artist Georgian Journal 6 February, 2016

Towers in Georgia (country)
Buildings and structures in Samegrelo-Zemo Svaneti
Svaneti